Darreh Barik or Darreh-ye Barik or Darrehbarik may refer to:
 Darreh Barik, Ilam
 Darreh-ye Barik, Bagh-e Malek, Khuzestan Province
 Darreh Barik, Izeh, Khuzestan Province
 Darreh Barik, Lali, Khuzestan Province